Friday Film House is an Indian film production company based in Malayalam film industry owned by Vijay Babu who is an actor as well as a producer and is one of the most talked about production houses in the south. Friday Film House has won 7 of the Kerala State Film Awards in various fields in 2014. It has its own distribution division – "Friday Tickets", digital/TV production under the brand "Friday Home Cinema" and music under "Friday Music Company". Notable projects include Aadu series, Angamaly Diaries, Philips and the Monkey Pen, June, Adi Kapyare Kootamani, Thrissur Pooram and Home.

Films

Television

References

External links
 Official website

Film production companies of Kerala
Film distributors of India
Indian companies established in 2012
2012 establishments in Kerala
Mass media companies established in 2012